Maharashtra State Highway 151, commonly referred to as SH 151, is a state highway that runs south through Solapur district in the state of Maharashtra.  This state highway touches the cities of Barshi – Vairag – Solapur – Akkalkot and then proceeds south towards Maharashtra-Karnataka state border.

Summary
In Solapur district this highway is also known as Barshi-Solapur-Akkalkot-Dudhani Road. During the Fifth Five-Year Plan a provision of Rs. 22.46 lakhs has been made for the improvement of this road with some minor bridges. Besides, Rs. 4.75 lakhs have also been sanctioned for a bridge on this road across the river Bori near Umarage.

This road emanates from Miraj-Pandharpur-Latur State highway at Barshi. Its total length in the district is 135 kilometres. The road runs towards south up to Solapur and then south-eastwards up to Dudhani. The road passes through Barshi, Solapur North, Solapur South and Akkalkot talukas. The road-surface up to Solapur is black-topped and is motorable throughout the year except for some interruptions during heavy rains. The entire length of the road up to Akkalkot is black-topped beyond which it is water-bound macadam. The road is motorable throughout the year except some obstructions at Bori river near Umarge village during the monsoon.

Route description
Below is the brief summary of the route followed by this state highway.

Solapur District

Barshi Taluka

This highway starts from Barshi City in Barshi Taluka of Solapur District and proceeds South East towards Akkalkot. After Travelling for another , it exits Barshi Taluka after crossing Shelgaon village and enters the Solapur North Taluka.

Solapur North Taluka
Once this highway enters Solapur North taluka, it travels for another  where merges in to National Highway 9 at Bale village and enters Solapur city. After travelling for  it exits Solapur North Taluka just before Kumbhari Village and enters Solapur South taluka.

Solapur South Taluka
After Kumbhari village this highway travels for another  and exits Solapur South taluka just before entering Karjal village and enters Akkalkot Taluka.

Akkalkot Taluka
After crossing Karjal village this highway travels for another  where State Highway 154 merges in to it just outside Akkalkot city. State Highway 154 travels with this highway for another  to enter Akkalkot city and then branches off north to continue towards Osmanabad district whereas this highway continues south-east. Inside Akkalkot city after another  State Highway 162 starts off from this highway and then continues north east towards Beed district, while this highway turns southwards towards Maharashtra-Karnataka state border near Dudhani village. From this point it continues in to Karnataka State.

Major junctions

The following roads either emanate from it or are crossed by it. This list has been separated by district and talukas for easy reading.

National Highways
 NH 9 at Bale village
 NH 13 at Solapur city
 NH 211 at Solapur city

State Highways
  State Highway 67 at Barshi city.
  State Highway 77 at Barshi city.
  State Highway 150 at Vairag village.
  State Highway 154 at Akkalkot city.
  State Highway 162 at Akkalkot city.

Connections 
This highway touches the following important places in its stretch. All the list has been separated by district and talukas for easy reading. Also in each table, the distance of the place from important places in the route of this highway are also mentioned.

Solapur District

See also
 List of State Highways in Maharashtra

References

State Highways in Maharashtra